Elliott Engen (born October 6, 1998) is an American politician serving in the Minnesota House of Representatives since 2023. A member of the Republican Party of Minnesota, Engen represents District 36A in the northern Twin Cities metropolitan area, which includes the cities of Lino Lakes, White Bear Township and Circle Pines and parts of Anoka and Ramsey Counties in Minnesota.

Early life, education and career 
Engen attended White Bear High School and got his bachelor's degree in legal studies and political science from Hamline University.

Minnesota House of Representatives 
Engen was elected to the Minnesota House of Representatives in 2022, after redistricting and the retirement of DFL incumbent Ami Wazlawik, whom he unsuccessfully challenged in 2020. Engen serves as an assistant minority leader for the House Republican caucus and sits on the Human Services Policy, Public Safety Finance and Policy, and Rules and Legislative Administration Committees.

Electoral history

Personal life 
Engen lives in White Bear Township, Minnesota with his wife, Faith.

References

External links 

Republican Party members of the Minnesota House of Representatives
1998 births
Living people